James Erskine is a British screenwriter, film director and producer. The Human Face (2001), which he co-directed, was nominated for the Outstanding Non-Fiction Special (Informational) Emmy Award in 2002.

Filmography

Films
The Invitation – writer and director
EMR (2004) – writer, director and producer
Closing the Deal (2005) – director and producer
Vanishing of the Bees (2009) – writer
One Night in Turin (2010) – writer and director
From the Ashes – writer and director
Battle of the Sexes (2013) – director and producer
Pantani: The Accidental Death of a Cyclist (2014) – writer and director
Shooting for Socrates (2014) – writer and director
Sachin: A Billion Dreams (2017) – director
The Ice King (2018) – writer, director and producer
Billie (2019) – writer and director
Healer – writer and director
The End of the Storm (2020)

Television
The Human Face (2001) – co-director

Awards
2002: The Human Face was nominated for the Outstanding Non-Fiction Special (Informational) Emmy Award

References

External links

British documentary film producers
21st-century British screenwriters
British documentary film directors
Living people
Year of birth missing (living people)
Place of birth missing (living people)